Providence University College and Theological Seminary is an interdenominational Evangelical Christian university college and theological seminary located approximately  south-east of Winnipeg in Otterburne, Manitoba.

History 
The Winnipeg Bible Training School was founded in Winnipeg, Manitoba, Canada in 1925, and renamed a short time later to Winnipeg Bible Institute. The founding was pushed forward by Reverend H. L. Turner.

When it received a provincial charter to grant theological degrees in 1949, it was renamed Winnipeg Bible Institute and College of Theology, and started a full degree-granting program and was renamed Winnipeg Bible College in 1963.

In 1970, facing the demolition of its quarters, shortfall in funds, and low enrolment, the college moved 50 kilometers south to Otterburne, Man., where it acquired the vacant building of the former St. Joseph's College, a Roman Catholic high school. Enrollment that year was 70 students.

A graduate division was formed as Providence Theological Seminary in 1972, which had full membership in the Association of Theological Schools (ATS). In 1992, the school was renamed Providence College and Theological Seminary. The name was further changed in 2011 to Providence University College and Theological Seminary. The school had enrollment of 525 in the University College and Seminary in 2019.

Academics

Providence University College

Providence University College offers Bachelor of Arts degrees with majors in Communications and Media, Biblical and Theological Studies, Business Administration, TESOL (Teaching English to Speakers of Other Languages), Humanities, and Social Sciences.

Providence University College has the following faculties.

 Biblical and Theological Studies. Providence College's core is in Biblical and Theological Studies. It is offered to students in three different programs: a 1-year Certificate in Biblical and Theological Studies; 3-year B.A. degrees in Old Testament, New Testament, and Theology; and 4-year B.A. degrees in Old Testament, New Testament, and Theology.
 Business Administration
 Communications and Media
 Aviation - studies in career and missionary flight
 Youth Leadership
 Humanities
 Social Sciences

Providence University College is also home to an English Language Institute which prepares international students, whose first language is not English, for successful academic studies at the post-secondary level.

The inter-denominational evangelical Providence Theological Seminary prepares workers for service in global ministries, pastoral ministry, counseling, TESOL, and wider Christian service.

Providence is accredited by The Association for Biblical Higher Education (ABHE), and offers over two hundred courses that are transferable to University of Manitoba, as well as other Canadian educational institutions such as Brandon University and the University of Winnipeg.

Providence Theological Seminary

The seminary offers one-year certificates and Master of Arts (in a range of majors and programs), Master of Divinity (in two tracks), and Doctor of Ministry (D.Min.) degrees. The various programs offer options for students seeking ordination, advanced training, and general knowledge. Examples of majors (M.A.): global ministries, educational studies, counseling, theological studies, and Christian studies.

For a two- or three-year degree, a one-year residency is required. In some cases, up to one year of courses can be studied on-line.

Because the faculty and student body are international in scope, professors and students bring an enriching range of perspectives and experiences to the classroom setting and broader community life.

The seminary publishes the journal Didaskalia.

William Falk Library and Learning Resource Centre
Providence College and Seminary proposed to improve the library facilities through the construction of this new learning resource centre. The Learning Resource Centre provides room for over 100,000 volumes and the latest in technology. The number of private study carrels and other private work stations was increased to 200. The facility is around 20,000  square feet.

Athletics

Providence is the home of the Pilots, who compete in both the National Christian College Athletic Association (NCCAA), as well as the Manitoba Colleges Athletics Conference (MCAC). Providence has teams for Men's and Women's basketball, volleyball, soccer, and men’s hockey. Providence University College is equipped with a fully functional gymnasium,  two regulation soccer fields, an ice rink and two beach volleyball courts.

Touring ensembles

Various touring and theatric ensembles operate out of Providence University College such as Aslan's Child, Once Lost, Prov Players, Providence University Choir, and Providence Chamber Choir. They play various forms of Christian music and other worship songs.

Notable alumni
Paul P. Enns, theologian
Henry Hildebrand, academic
Erwin Lutzer, theologian
Jordan Peters, curler
Gwen Smid, writer
 Matt Fast and John Paul Peters of The Undecided, musicians
Andrew Unger, writer

See also

List of evangelical seminaries and theological colleges
List of universities in the Canadian Prairies
Higher education in Manitoba

References

External links
 Providence University-College
 Student Pamphleteer - MyProv.ca
 Harv's Air Service

Universities and colleges in Manitoba
Association of Christian College Athletics member schools
Evangelical universities and colleges in Canada
Educational institutions established in 1925
Evangelical seminaries and theological colleges in Canada
1925 establishments in Manitoba
Eastman Region, Manitoba